Lestat may refer to:

Lestat de Lioncourt, vampire character introduced in Anne Rice's 1976 novel Interview with the Vampire
Lestat (band), American dark wave gothic band active 1988–2000 and 2010-2014                                                                         
Lestat (musical), 2006 Broadway show based on Anne Rice's The Vampire Chronicles